This is a list of commemorative coins issued by the Central Bank of Russia in 1998:

References

1998
Commemorative coins